The 1983–84 Oral Roberts Titans men's basketball team represented Oral Roberts University during the 1983–84 NCAA Division I men's basketball season. The Titans, led by 2nd year head coach Dick Acres, played their home games at the Mabee Center and were members of the Midwestern City Conference. They finished the season 21–10, 11–3 in MCC play to be crowned regular season champions. They won the Midwestern City tournament to receive an automatic bid to the NCAA tournament as No. 11 seed in the Midwest region. The Titans lost to No. 6 seed Memphis State in the opening round.

Roster

Schedule and results

|-
!colspan=9 style=| Exhibition

|-
!colspan=9 style=| Regular season

|-
!colspan=9 style=| MCC tournament

|-
!colspan=9 style=| NCAA tournament

References

Oral Roberts Golden Eagles men's basketball seasons
Oral Roberts
Oral Roberts
1983 in sports in Oklahoma
1984 in sports in Oklahoma